Devastations were an indie rock band from Melbourne, Australia, they were active from 2002 to 2010. The band's solemn lamentations often earned comparisons to artists such as Nick Cave and Tindersticks.

Band history
The band was founded in 2002 by Tom Carlyon, Hugo Cran and Conrad Standish after the end of their former band Luxedo. Originally called The Devastations to mimic the style of bands such as The Temptations, "The" was later dropped.

On 5 May 2003 the band released their self-titled debut album. In 2004, the band was signed to Beggars Banquet Records for the European release. Their self-titled debut album was named by Rolling Stone Germany as the best debut of 2004.

On 19 September 2005, the band released their second studio album, Coal. The album was nominated for the 2005 Australian Music Prize.

On 17 September 2007, the band released their third studio album, Yes, U. The album was also nominated for The Australian Music Prize. Yes, U, was also nominated for Best Album at the EG Awards of 2007.

Patrick Donovan from the Age said "Yes, U is a dark, sexy and at times claustrophobic record. By using an 808 drum machine and recording with Hate Rock keyboardist Adam Yang, they move into more electronic territory that recalls the avant garde works of Yoko Ono (her ethereal song "Walking on Thin Ice" was a reference point for the band's "Black Ice"), Grace Jones, Suicide, David Bowie and Scott Walker." Carlyon said "With [Yes U], we wanted to move away from the traditional song structure and focus more on sounds, and just see where the songs took us, We didn't want to be in control of the process. We wanted to make a different album to Coal. Anyone can write a song. We were more interested in the sounds. The drum machine opened up a world of possibilities."

In 2008, Devastations recorded a cover of the Cure's 1981 song "All Cats Are Grey" for Perfect as Cats: A Tribute to the Cure, a charity record released in October 2008 by Los Angeles indie label Manimal Vinyl.

In 2009, Devastations collaborated with New York City-based band Blonde Redhead to record "When the Road Runs Out" for the AIDS benefit album Dark Was the Night produced by the Red Hot Organization.

By 2010, Devastations had disbanded, although Carlyon and Standish later reunited as an electronic music duo, Standish/Carlyon, releasing the album Deleted Scenes in 2013.

Personnel
 Tom Carlyon – guitar, piano
 Hugo Cran – drums
 Conrad Standish – vocals, bass

Discography

Studio albums

Awards and nominations

Australian Music Prize
The Australian Music Prize (the AMP) is an annual award of $30,000 given to an Australian band or solo artist in recognition of the merit of an album released during the year of award. The commenced in 2005.

|-
| 2005
|Coal
| Australian Music Prize
| 
|-
|-
| 2007
|Yes U
| Australian Music Prize
| 
|-

EG Awards/Music Victoria Awards
The Music Victoria Awards (previously known as The Age EG Awards and The Age Music Victoria Awards) are an annual awards night celebrating Victorian music. They commenced in 2005.

|-
| EG Awards of 2007
| Yes, U
| Best Album
| 
|-

References

Australian indie rock groups
Musical groups from Melbourne
Victoria (Australia) musical groups
Musical groups established in 2002
Musical groups disestablished in 2010